Topole is a settlement in the Municipality of Mengeš in the Upper Carniola region of Slovenia.

References

External links

Topole on Geopedia

Populated places in the Municipality of Mengeš